Bridge in Porter Township is a historic lenticular truss bridge spanning Pine Creek at Porter Township, Lycoming County, Pennsylvania.

It was added to the National Register of Historic Places in 1988.

See also
List of bridges documented by the Historic American Engineering Record in Pennsylvania

References

External links

Road bridges on the National Register of Historic Places in Pennsylvania
Bridges completed in 1889
Bridges in Lycoming County, Pennsylvania
Historic American Engineering Record in Pennsylvania
National Register of Historic Places in Lycoming County, Pennsylvania
Lenticular truss bridges in the United States